Robert Shelton IV (born August 25, 1995) is an American professional golfer from Mobile, Alabama.

Shelton attended and played college for three years at the University of Alabama from 2013 to 2016. He turned professional in 2016 after his junior year.

Shelton played on the 2015 Walker Cup team where he posted a record of 2–1. He also played on the U.S. Palmer Cup team in 2014 and 2015.

As an amateur, he finished tied for third at the 2015 Barbasol Championship on the PGA Tour. This was the highest finish by an amateur in a PGA Tour event since Phil Mickelson in 1991. He also qualified for the 2014 U.S. Open where he missed the cut.

Shelton won the Southern Hills Plantation on the Swing Thought Tour in February 2017, his first professional win. He followed it up with a June win on the PGA Tour Canada en route to finishing second on the tour's money list to earn a promotion to the Web.com Tour.

Professional wins (6)

Korn Ferry Tour wins (4)

Korn Ferry Tour playoff record (2–1)

PGA Tour Canada wins (1)

Swing Thought Tour wins (1)
2017 Southern Hills Plantation

Results in major championships
Results not in chronological order in 2020.

CUT = missed the halfway cut
NT = No tournament due to COVID-19 pandemic

Results in The Players Championship

CUT = missed the halfway cut

Team appearances
Amateur
Junior Ryder Cup (representing the United States): 2012 (winners)
Palmer Cup (representing the United States): 2014, 2015 (winners)
Walker Cup (representing the United States): 2015

Professional
Aruba Cup (representing PGA Tour Canada): 2017 (winners)

See also
2019 Korn Ferry Tour Finals graduates
2022 Korn Ferry Tour Finals graduates
List of golfers with most Korn Ferry Tour wins

References

External links

American male golfers
Alabama Crimson Tide men's golfers
PGA Tour golfers
Korn Ferry Tour graduates
Golfers from Alabama
People from Mobile County, Alabama
1995 births
Living people